Aladinge Waldin is a 2003 Sri Lankan Sinhala comedy film directed by Upali Piyaratne and produced by Anura de Silva & Thilak Mapatuna for Indu Films. It stars Tennyson Cooray and Sasanthi Jayasekara in lead roles along with Cletus Mendis and Sunil Hettiarachchi. Music composed by Sarath de Alwis. It is the 1004th Sri Lankan film in the Sinhala cinema.

Plot

Cast
 Tennyson Cooray as Aladdin 'Dean Martin'
 Sasanthi Jayasekara as Kasturi
 Cletus Mendis as Mr. Dekatana 'Julie'
 Sunil Hettiarachchi as Gulliver
 Mark Samson as Prison mentor
 Buddhika Rambukwella as Police Inspector
 Rebeka Nirmali as Kasturi's aunt
 Saman Almeida as Minister Samayawardana
 Richard Manamudali as 'Femme' Kajan
 Saliya Sathyajith as Salama

References

2003 films
2000s Sinhala-language films
2003 comedy films
Sri Lankan comedy films